Cannonball is the fourth studio album by American country music artist Pat Green. It was released in 2006 (see 2006 in country music) as his first album for BNA Records. This album produced three singles for him on the Billboard Hot Country Songs charts: "Feels Just Like It Should" at No. 13, "Dixie Lullaby" at No. 24, and "Way Back Texas" at No. 28.

Track listing

Personnel
 Pat Green – lead vocals, background vocals, acoustic guitar
 J. T. Corenflos – electric guitar
 Michael Daly – steel guitar
 Sara Evans – duet vocals on "Finder's Keepers"
 Kenny Greenberg – electric guitar
 John Hobbs – piano, Hammond organ
 Greg Morrow – drums
 Herb Pedersen – background vocals
 Justin Andrew Pollard – percussion, tambourine
 Michael Rhodes – bass guitar
 Biff Watson – acoustic guitar
 John Willis – acoustic guitar
 Jonathan Yudkin – violin, banjo,  strings

Chart performance

Album

References

2006 albums
BNA Records albums
Pat Green albums
Albums produced by Don Gehman